Ant Farm is the third album by the jazz group 8 Bold Souls. It was recorded in July and August 1994 in Chicago, and was released later that year by Arabesque Records. The album features performances by saxophonist, clarinetist, and composer Edward Wilkerson, saxophonist Mwata Bowden, trumpeter Robert Griffin, Jr., trombonist Isaiah Jackson, tubist Aaron Dodd, cellist Naomi Millender, bassist Harrison Bankhead, and drummer Dushun Mosley.

Reception

In a review for AllMusic, Brian Olewnick wrote: "All the pieces are by leader Wilkerson, tending toward a jaunty swing spiced with a tinge of down-home rhythm and blues and a taste of gospel. Once again, his ensemble is made up of all fine instrumentalists, playing the written parts with verve and improvising imaginatively."

The authors of the Penguin Guide to Jazz Recordings awarded the album 3 stars, calling it "a fine continuation" of the band's previous release, Sideshow. They noted that Wilkerson's "debt to Henry Threadgill's early work is... clear," and commented: "the group has its own democratic character: Jackson, Bowden and Griffin impress as individual voices, growing in stature, and the leader's writing always seems to have a surprise up its sleeve."

Track listing
All compositions by Edward Wilkerson.

 "Half Life" – 8:52
 "A Little Encouragement" – 9:29
 "Ant Farm" – 16:07
 "The Corner of Walk and Don't Walk" – 10:12
 "Furthest From My Mind" – 9:35
 "The Big Dig" – 8:21

Personnel 
 Edward Wilkerson – alto saxophone, tenor saxophone, alto clarinet, clarinet, voice
 Mwata Bowden – baritone saxophone, tenor saxophone, clarinet, bass clarinet, voice
 Robert Griffin, Jr. – trumpet, piccolo trumpet, voice
 Isaiah Jackson – trombone, timbales, voice
 Aaron Dodd – tuba, voice
 Naomi Millender – cello, voice
 Harrison Bankhead – bass, voice
 Dushun Mosley – drums, congas, voice

References

8 Bold Souls albums
1994 albums
Arabesque Records albums